Schiller Park is a neighborhood of Buffalo, New York, located in the easternmost part of the city along the Cheektowaga border.

Geography
The neighborhood centers on Schiller Park, a city park. East Delavan Avenue is located on the northern border of the neighborhood, and Broadway borders the south. The eastern boundary is East End Avenue and the hamlet of Pine Hill, while Bailey Avenue serves as the western boundary.

Notable places and events
Turner-Carroll High School

References

Neighborhoods in Buffalo, New York